National Chin-Yi University of Technology (NCUT) is a public university located in Taiping District, Taichung, Taiwan.

Some of the most popular programs at NCYU include Mechanical Engineering, Electrical Engineering, Information Management, Environmental Engineering, and Finance. The university also offers programs in fields such as Applied English, Digital Media Design, and Industrial Design.

History
NCUT was initially established as Chin-Yi Technical Vocational Junior College in 1971 as a private school. In 1973, it was renamed Chin-Yi Institute of Technology. In 1992, the school was nationalized. On 1 July 1999, it was designated as National Chin-Yi Institute of Technology. On 1 February 2007, it was officially designated as the National Chin-Yi University of Technology.

Faculties
NCUT comprises five colleges: Electrical Engineering and Computer Science, Engineering, General Education, Humanities and Creativity, and Management.

See also
 List of universities in Taiwan

References

External links

 

1971 establishments in Taiwan
Universities and colleges in Taichung
Educational institutions established in 1971
Scientific organizations based in Taiwan
Universities and colleges in Taiwan
Technical universities and colleges in Taiwan